Kwaksan Airport(곽산비행장) is an airport in Pyongan-bukto, North Korea.

Facilities 
The airfield has a single asphalt runway 04/22 measuring 2340 x 92 feet (713 x 28 m).  It has a partial parallel taxiway, and a fair amount of infrastructure leading to dispersed parking as far as 2 km southeast of the runway.  It is home to a bomber regiment of 24 Ilyushin Il-28 jets.

References 

Airports in North Korea